Eugeniusz Arct (24 December 1899 – 22 January 1974) was a Polish painter. His work was part of the painting event in the art competition at the 1936 Summer Olympics.

References

External links
 

1899 births
1974 deaths
20th-century Polish painters
20th-century Polish male artists
Olympic competitors in art competitions
Artists from Odesa
Polish male painters